Pakistan Television Football Club or commonly referred as PTV F.C. is a Pakistani football based in Islamabad, Islamabad Capital Territory. The club has won 1 Football Federation League title, winning the second division in 2006–07 season.

Pakistan Television play their home matches at Jinnah Sports Stadium, the club used to share the stadium with their rivals Zarai Taraqiati from 2010 to 2013. The stadium also is the home to Pakistan national football team.

History
The club was formed in 2002 to represent Pakistan Television. In the year of their inception, the club played Humma Club in the finals of Jashn-e-Azadi Sports Festival, winning the match 2–1.

Pakistan Premier League Era

Success and promotion
In 2005–06 the club entered the newly formed second division, the Football Federation League, they were placed in the "Group C" with Pakistan Railways and Pakistan Ordnance Factory, they failed to progress after finishing bottom of the group, losing 3 drawing 1 game.

In the 2006–07, Pakistan Television topped their group in the Football Federation League and defeated Dera XI 3–1 in the finals to progress to second stage. They finished second in their group in the second stage and qualified for semi-finals of the tournament. They defeated Sui Southern Gas 1–0 in the semi-finals and routed PMC Athletico 4–0 in the finals, winning the Football Federation League and got promoted to Pakistan Premier League

Top-flight and downfall: 2007 to 2009
The club's first match in the top-division was a 3–0 loss to WAPDA. On 4 November, the club defeated Pakistan Railways 2–1 to record their first ever top-division victory. On 24 November, the club suffered their biggest defeat, losing 6–0 to Pakistan Army. The club ended their first season in Pakistan Premier League at 11th position with 23 points, just 2 points above the relegated rivals Pakistan Railways. The club was selected for 2008 National Football Challenge Cup but withdrew from the competition. for unknown reasons.

In the 2008–09 season, the club went on to 15 consecutive defeats before defeating Pakistan Navy 2–1 on the 16th match-day. After finishing two more matches as the 2–2 and 0–0 draw, the club went on to lose remaining seven matches as they finished bottom of the table with just 5 points (from 1 win and 2 draws), it is also the lowest points ever earned by team in the history of Pakistan Premier League.

Second division
In 2009–10 season, the club topped their group in the Football Federation League to qualify for the finals. They lost 1–0 to Sui Southern Gas and failed to get promoted back to Pakistan Premier League. 
The club qualified for the final stages of 2010–11 Pakistan Football Federation League, they finished third in their group, failing to get promotion. 
In the 2011–12 Pakistan Football Federation League the club topped their initial group to qualify for final stages, however the club finished two point behind rivals Zarai Taraqiati. The 2012–13 Football Federation League season was their worst second division ever as they lost 3 and draw 1 out of 4 matches, with scoring 2 goals and conceding 8 as they finished bottom of the initial group. In 2013–14, Pakistan Television were placed in group with Higher Education Commission and Bhatti United, and were favorites to top the group, however the club lost both the matches and finished bottom of the group. In 2014–15 season the club topped their initial group, winning both their games, in the final stages they lost all three matches, conceding 10 goals and scoring zero.

Rivalry
The club shares rivalry with Pakistan Railways as both of the club have spent most of their seasons in the second division. The club also shared a brief rivalry with Zarai Taraqiati due to both clubs sharing same home ground. Zarai Taraqiati got dissolved in the mid-2013 season.

Pakistan Railways
The clubs first met in 2005–06 Football Federation League season. Both the clubs were placed in the same group, Pakistan Railways the first game 3–1 and lost the second 1–0. The most recent meeting between the both sides was in the 2011–12 Pakistan Football Federation League, with Pakistan Television defeating Pakistan Railways 3–0.

All-time results

Summary of results

Zarai Taraqiati
Pakistan Television's rivalry with Zarai Taraqiati was due to both clubs sharing the same home ground. The rivalry was not an intense rivalry like K-Electric–Khan Research Laboratories or the Punjab derby (including Khan Research Laboratories, Pakistan Army and WAPDA).

All-time results

Summary of results

Current players

Honours
Football Federation League: 1
 2006–07

Football clubs in Pakistan
Pakistan Television Corporation
Works association football clubs in Pakistan
Association football clubs established in 2002
2002 establishments in Pakistan
Football in Islamabad